The 2019 European Youth Summer Olympic Festival was held in Baku, Azerbaijan, between 21 and 27 July 2019.

Sports
The following competitions took place:

Venues

Schedule
The competition schedule for the 2019 European Youth Olympic Summer Festival is as follows:

Participant nations
48 EOCs participated in the EYOF 2019. Armenia decided to boycott the EYOF. Liechtenstein did not compete. One refugee athlete, originally from Eritrea, and at that time based in Israel, competed at these games.

Medal table

References

External links

 
European Youth Summer Olympic Festival
European Youth Summer Olympic Festival
European Youth Summer Olympic Festival
Youth Summer Olympic Festival
Multi-sport events in Azerbaijan
European Youth Summer Olympic Festival
Sports competitions in Baku
Youth sport in Azerbaijan
European Youth Summer Olympic Festival